The 1982 Family Circle Cup was a women's tennis tournament played on outdoor clay courts at the Sea Pines Racquet Club on Hilton Head Island, South Carolina in the United States that was part of the 1982 Avon Championships World Championship Series. It was the 10th edition of the tournament and was held from April 5 through April 11, 1982. Second-seeded Martina Navratilova won the singles title and earned $34,000 first-prize money.

Finals

Singles
 Martina Navratilova defeated  Andrea Jaeger 6–4, 6–2
 It was Navratilova's 6th singles title of the year and the 61st of her career.

Doubles
 Martina Navratilova /  Pam Shriver defeated  JoAnne Russell /  Virginia Ruzici 6–1, 6–2

Prize money

References

External links
 Women's Tennis Association (WTA) tournament edition details
 International Tennis Federation (ITF) tournament edition details

Charleston Open
Family Circle Cup
Family Circle Cup
Family Circle Cup
Family Circle Cup